The Everton Former Players' Foundation is a registered charity based in [moreton, England. The Foundation raises money for the physical and pastoral care of former football players who have previously been contracted to Everton.

Money is raised for the charity through the following main sources:

A testimonial game for a former player, the usual arrangement being that the Foundation receive 50% of the proceeds.
A Foundation day at which the Foundation raises money through raffles in the lounges at Goodison Park.
Regular raffles before each home game at Goodison Park.
Dinners and social functions throughout the year at which former players normally attend and speak to the guests.

Patrons
The Patrons of the charity are:

Duncan McKenzie - Former player
Graeme Sharp - Former player
Barry Horne - Former player
Bill Kenwright - Everton F.C. Chairman
David France - Founder
Alan Stubbs - Former player
Joe Royle - Former player and manager
Derek Temple - Former player
Tony Bellew - Former boxer, WBC cruiserweight champion

References

External links
 
 

Everton F.C.
1999 establishments in England